Xylopia magna is a species of plant in the Annonaceae family. It is a tree found in Malaysia and Singapore.

References

magna
Trees of Malaya
Flora of Peninsular Malaysia
Flora of Singapore
Least concern plants
Least concern biota of Asia
Taxonomy articles created by Polbot